Chris Wightman (born 24 April 1966) is a Canadian luger. He competed in the men's singles event at the 1988 Winter Olympics.

References

External links
 

1966 births
Living people
Canadian male lugers
Olympic lugers of Canada
Lugers at the 1988 Winter Olympics
Sportspeople from Ottawa